Jon-Magne Karlstad (born November 10, 1958 in Oslo, Norway) is a former Norwegian ice hockey player. He played for the club Vålerengens IF. He played for the Norwegian national ice hockey team at the 1984 and 1992 Winter Olympics.

References

1958 births
Living people
Ice hockey players at the 1984 Winter Olympics
Ice hockey players at the 1992 Winter Olympics
Norwegian ice hockey players
Olympic ice hockey players of Norway
Ice hockey people from Oslo
Vålerenga Ishockey players